Mrityunjoy Murmu is an Indian politician from All India Trinamool Congress. In May 2021, he was elected as the member of the West Bengal Legislative Assembly from Raipur, Bankura (Vidhan Sabha constituency).

Personal life
Murmu is from Raipur, Bankura district, West Bengal. His father's name is Junilal Murmu. He passed H.S. from Napara High School in 1994.

Political life
He has been elected as the member of the West Bengal Legislative Assembly from Raipur, Bankura (Vidhan Sabha constituency). He has won the election.

References 

Trinamool Congress politicians from West Bengal
West Bengal MLAs 2021–2026
Year of birth missing (living people)
Living people
People from Bankura district